On 22 August 2022, Olivia Pratt-Korbel, a nine-year-old English girl, was mistakenly shot by a masked gunman in Liverpool, and was pronounced dead the same day at the city's Alder Hey Children's Hospital. The attack took place at the doorstep of the Pratt-Korbel family's home; the intended target of the attack was a 35-year-old man who had criminal convictions for drug dealing and burglary. During the attack, Pratt-Korbel was with her mother who grappled with two men whilst shielding her. One of the men fired at her mother's wrist, with the bullet then going through Pratt-Korbel's chest.

Background
Olivia Pratt-Korbel was an English girl born in 2012 or 2013. Her mother was aged 46 of the time of the shooting. Pratt-Korbel had an older brother and sister and lived in Liverpool, North West England.

Killing
On 22 August 2022, Pratt-Korbel's mother heard a disturbance outside and opened her front door, whilst her daughter Olivia was behind her. A man who was one of two men fleeing from the unknown gunman, attempted to force himself into her home. Whilst the man was attempting to enter the Pratt-Korbel household, the gunman, who was wearing a balaclava and a black jacket, approached the house and shot 4 times. One of the bullets went through Korbel's mother's wrist and into Olivia, leading to her death. The intended target of the attack was a 35 year-old man who is a convicted criminal for drug dealing and burglary. Pratt-Korbel's siblings were in the house upstairs during the attack. Pratt-Korbel was later declared dead at Alder Hey Children's Hospital, Liverpool. Merseyside Police understand the 35-year-old man walked away from the dying child and her injured mother to get in an escape vehicle, a black Audi car. Police say the man is a "well-established organised crime group member". 

The next day, the shot man was arrested for breaching his licence conditions and is being returned to prison. He was released in 2021, for reaching halfway through his sentence.

Investigation
During the late night of 25 August 2022, a 36-year-old man was arrested on suspicion of the murder of Pratt-Korbel and two counts of attempted murder from his flat in Huyton.

The inquest heard that a police officer attempted to save Olivia's life after the shooting.

As of 30 August 2022, the two men have been released. On 1 September, Merseyside Police released CCTV footage of the gunman. On 4 September 2022 one man was arrested on suspicion of murder and attempted murder, and two others detained on suspicion of assisting an offender. On 7 September the suspects were bailed. On 8 September another man was arrested. A ninth man was arrested on 10 September 2022. 

On 29 September, police arrested a 34-year-old man on suspicion of murder. On 30 September, a man was arrested on suspicion of assisting an offender. On 1 October, a 34-year old man was charged with the murder, two counts of attempted murder as well as two counts of possession of a firearm with intent to endanger life. A 40-year-old man was also charged with assisting an offender. The two men appeared at Liverpool Crown Court on 3 October.

Trial 
The trial of Thomas Cashman began at Manchester Crown Court on 7 March 2023.

Reactions
Prime Minister Boris Johnson described the killing as a "horrific, senseless shooting". Johnson added: "This is an unimaginable tragedy and we will ensure Merseyside Police get whatever they need to catch those responsible and secure justice for Olivia." Home Secretary Priti Patel visited the site of the shooting and pledged more money for Merseyside Police to reduce weapons and violence.

Liverpool F.C. manager Jürgen Klopp called the killing "such a tragedy" and said "If we can help, we will". Everton F.C. manager Frank Lampard encouraged people to inform police if they had information about the attack. Liverpool held a tribute for Olivia Pratt-Korbel during their match against Bournemouth, which was their first match since the shooting. In a later game between Liverpool and Everton, the fans of the two teams also paid tribute to her at the ninth minute of the match.

References

2020s in Liverpool
August 2022 events in the United Kingdom
Deaths by firearm in England
Deaths by person in England
Violent non-state actor incidents in the United Kingdom